Velké Losiny is a spa municipality and village in Šumperk District in the Olomouc Region of the Czech Republic. It has about 2,500 inhabitants.

Administrative parts
Villages of Bukovice, Ludvíkov, Maršíkov and Žárová are administrative parts of Velké Losiny.

Geography
It lies mostly in the Hanušovice Highlands. A small part of the municipal territory in the east extends into the Hrubý Jeseník mountains. The village is located in the valley of the Losinka creek.

History
The first written mention of Velké Losiny is from 1296. The most notable owners were the Zierotin family, who acquired it in the second half of the 15th century and held it more than 300 years. The family had rebuilt the local fortress into a castle, had built new church and founded here a spa and a paper mill.

In 1678–1692 Velké Losiny was the centre of the most infamous witch trials in the nowadays Czech Republic. They were conducted by Heinrich Franz Boblig von Edelstadt, who was summoned to Velké Losiny by Countess Galle and eventually stopped by the brothers Joachim and Maximilian of Zierotin.

At the end of the 18th century, the Zierotins fell into debt and began selling their estates. In 1802, they had to sell Velké Losiny with the castle to the House of Liechtenstein, in whose possession it remained until 1945.

Demographics

Sights
Most popular tourist sites are the castle, the spa and the handmade paper mill, the oldest in Europe. Notable is also the late Renaissance Church of Saint John the Baptist from 1599–1603.

Castle
The castle was built by Jan the Younger of Zierotin approximately in 1567–1589, on the site of an earlier Gothic fortress. The castle consists of three wings overlooking the courtyard with three floors of arcade galleries and is crowned by a narrow octagonal tower. At the turn of the 18th century the Renaissance buildings were extended with a further three, also arcaded, Baroque-style wings, to which were added a Baroque-style garden featuring romantic little structures and statues.

According to unfounded reports the Austrian poet Franz Grillparzer stayed in the castle in the 19th century; he was supposed to have based his tragedy The Matriarch on the sad romantic story of the ghostly Zierotin protectoress.

The castle interiors are among the most remarkable Renaissance spaces in the Czech Republic and most beautiful of all is the banqueting hall with panelled ceiling. The picture gallery houses a collection of Italian, Dutch and Flemish paintings from the 17th and 18th centuries. The Zierotin armoury contains a collection of pistols and guns made by master gunsmiths at home and abroad from the 17–19th centuries.

Spa

Velké Losiny is a minor spa municipality with one of the oldest spas in Moravia. The spa was founded in 1562 by Jan the Younger of Zierotin, and a wooden spa building was built here in 1592. The sulfur curative thermal water pumped from a depth of  underground reaches temperatures up to 37 °C. The spa buildings are today situated within a park created in 1861, which contains rare trees, rhododendrons and azaleas.

The spa specialises in treating mobility disorders and neurological and skin diseases.

Paper mill

The distinguishing feature of the municipality is an old paper mill in which paper was handmade. It is a national cultural monument and an applicant for inclusion on the UNESCO World Heritage Sites list.

It was established by the Zierotins between 1591 and 1596 but only produced real wealth in the second half of the 19th century. At the turn of the 18th and 19th centuries, the set of buildings acquired its present-day late Baroque and Neoclassical appearance. Not only it is one of the oldest paper mills in Europe, but it has also been in continuous operation since it was founded.

Since 1987 the factory houses the Museum of the Paper, which is the only one of its kind in the country. It presents the history of paper-making from the use of the old traditional techniques right up to the deployment of modern industrial technologies.

Notable people
Milan Horáček (born 1946), German politician

References

External links

Villages in Šumperk District
Spa towns in the Czech Republic